Peter of Alexandria may refer to various men holding the following titles and name:

 Pope Peter of Alexandria (disambiguation), seven Popes from the year 300 to 1852
 Patriarch Peter of Alexandria (disambiguation), seven Patriarchs from the year 300 to 2004